Endgame: Blueprint for Global Enslavement is a 2007 American conspiracy theory documentary film written and directed by Alex Jones.

Content
In the film, Alex Jones presents his claim of a eugenics-obsessed group leading the world, whose mission is the elimination of most of the Earth's population and the enslavement of the remainder. He claims that an international network has been "steering planetary affairs for hundreds of years." and that fundamental theories of eugenics are used by governments as a form of control.

The film features the Georgia Guidestones, a 19-foot high megalithic granite monument installed in Elberton in 1982 that drew 20,000 annual visitors. The stones were damaged by bombing on July 7, 2022, leading to their dismantlement. Jones admitted to enjoying the destruction, "at an animal level", though he added he would also would have liked them to remain as an "evil edifice" exposing supposed depopulation plans.

Cast
Jim Tucker
Daniel Estulin
Alex Jones

Critical reception

Glenn Erickson of DVD Talk wrote that the film is "so obnoxious and pernicious, it's scary", and found that "Endgame instead sells a wild and moronic conspiracy fantasy with something to offer every malcontent and paranoid on the planet." The Courier Online described it as, "...conspiracy ridden... written and directed by professional nutter Alex Jones."

References

External links
 
 

2007 films
Alex Jones
Documentary films about conspiracy theories
2000s English-language films
Eugenics